Tek-ko-kui (Chinese: 竹篙鬼; Pe̍h-ōe-jī: Tek-ko-kúi; lit. "bamboo ghost") is a legendary demon in Taiwanese folklore.

Legend 
It is said that they reside in bamboo forest. When someone wants to pass through the bamboo forest, the bamboo will bend and block the way. People can't step over, otherwise, the bamboo will hang people up in the air. The force is so great that it will kill or injure people. If stop moving forward, the bamboo will stand upright again. For example, there is a Tek-ko-kui living in the bamboo forest near the Kawabata Bridge (now Zhongzheng Bridge) in Taipei.

See also
 Lists of legendary creatures
 Yōkai

References 

Taiwanese folklore
Legendary creatures